Ajrara gharana or Ajrada gharana is one of the six main traditional schools in tabla drum. The distinctiveness of this Gharana is the use of complex Bols and Meend. Pakhawaj bols are rare. The stress is on Ad and Barabar laya. It specializes in the three-time pattern. The position of the left drum is not changed, but its face is touched with the thumb.

History
This school was founded in the nineteenth century by Miru Khan and Kallu Khan, disciples of Sitab Khan of the Delhi gharana, at the Ajrara village, in Uttar Pradesh.

Playing style
Clarity of sound is made possible by the propensity for using the index and middle fingers in the traditional manner. The Ajrara gharana style includes more complicated bol patterns than the Delhi gharana. This is because the third fingers are brought into play as well. Bols like Dhina GiNa, Ghe Ghe Tit Kit, Dha Ge Na etc. are most frequently used. These bols create a certain resonance. Pakhawaj bols are rarely used in this gharana.

Gheginak, gheghe, Dhadagena, Nadagena or Tadagena etc. are used in the kayadas.

Ajrada is most well known for its theme and various compositions (mainly kayadas) as well as its beautiful and balanced Bayan (bass drum) work. The kayadas of Ajrada, often have an additional third line out of four. This is one of the few unique features of Ajrada Gharana kayadas.

Following is the typical Ajrada kayada based on Teen Taal:

DhaGe DhiNaGina  DhaTeTiReKiTaTaKaTiReKiTa  DhaGeDhiNa  DhaTiTeDhaGeTiNaGiNa

1   --------------------                     2   --------------------                        3 --------------------                       4

TaGe TiNaGiNa  TaTeTiReKiTaTaKeTiReKiTa  DhaGeDhiNa  DhaTiTaDhaGeDhiNaGiNa  (First 8)

5                    6                     7                           8

DhaGe DhiNaGiNa  DhaTeTiReKiTaTaKaTiReKiTa  DhaGeDhiNa  DhaTiTeDhaGeTiNaGiNa

9                        10                             11                 12

TaGe TiNaGiNa  TaTeTiReKiTaTaKeTiReKiTa  DhaGeDhiNa  DhaTiTaDhaGeDhiNaGiNa (Second 8 Bits)

13                     14                    15                    16

Prominent exponents

Though, on the world stage Ajrada is weakly represented, the gharanas compositions are played by almost everyone. The most notable representative of this gharana has been Ustad Habibuddin Khan. Maestros like Ustad Amir Hussain Khan and Shaikh Dawood excelled in the rendition of many rare and poetic compositions of Ajrada.

Manju Khan Sahib, son and student of Ustad Habibuddin Khan Sahib, is a great representative of Ajrada Gharana. So also Ustad Niazu Khan and Pandit Sudhirkumar Saxena (professor at M.S.University, Baroda, and student of Habibuddin Khan) were noted teachers. Pt. Sudhirkumar Saxena lived for many years in Baroda and also made such pupils like Shri. Madhukar Gurav and many more out of which Pandit Vikram Patil based in Baroda is the extraordinarily skilled exponent of the Ajrada gharana.

Pandit Vikram Patil is a global celebrity today raved for his versatility of Tabla Solo. Accompaniment to celebrity Light Music Vocalists of India and has dedicated his life to pass onto the upcoming generation the skills of the Tabla. Pandit Vikram's contribution to the world of music is immense and impeccable. His own innovations and creations of kayadas are so unique and difficult that the representatives of Ajrada gharana find it a dream to reproduce them. Ramzan Khan and Manju Khan have been students from this gharana as well.  Another living exponent is Ustad Hashmat Ali Khan. 

Ustad Akram Khan is considered one of to be the torch bearers of Ajrada Gharana. Ustad Shakeel Ahmed Khan, Ustad Ghulam Sarvar Sabri, Ustad Akram Khan, Shri Gulfam Sabri, and Pandit Vikram Patil are among the finest young representatives of Ajrada gharana today. The disciples of Ustad Manju Khan Saheb are Anil Kumar from Ludhiana, and Ustad Athar Hussain Khan, Parvez Hussain, Aman Ali Shahbaaz Khan from New Delhi.These are one of the best tabla players of Ajrada Gharana in the country or rather world.

References
 The Major Traditions of North Indian Tabla Drumming: A Survey Presentation Based on Performances by India's Leading Artists, by Robert S. Gottlieb. Pub. Musikverlag E. Katzbichler, 1977. .

Tabla gharanas
Music of Uttar Pradesh